Hoosimbim Mountain is a summit in Trinity County, California, in the United States.

Hoosimbim is derived from a Wintu-language phrase meaning "buzzard's water".

References

Mountains of Trinity County, California
Klamath Mountains
Mountains of Northern California